Rissoella diaphana is a species of gastropod belonging to the family Rissoellidae.

The species is found in Western Europe and Mediterranean.

References

Rissoellidae